Marion Hedda Ilse Gräfin von Dönhoff (2 December 1909 – 11 March 2002) was a German journalist and publisher who participated in the resistance against Nazism, along with Helmuth James Graf von Moltke, Peter Yorck von Wartenburg, and Claus Schenk Graf von Stauffenberg. After the war, she became one of Germany's leading journalists and intellectuals, working for over 55 years as an editor and later publisher of the Hamburg-based weekly newspaper Die Zeit.

Biography

Dönhoff was born in East Prussia in 1909 into the old aristocratic Dönhoff family at Schloss Friedrichstein  Kilian Heck / Christian Thielemann (eds.): Friedrichstein. The castle of the Counts of Dönhoff in East Prussia . Deutscher Kunstverlag, Munich and Berlin 2006 and 2019, ISBN 978-3-422-07361-6(pl) (de) (now in the Gurkyevsky District of the Russian oblast of Kaliningrad). Her father was Count August von Dönhoff, a diplomat and member of the Prussian House of Lords and the German Parliament. As a diplomat, he was located in Washington for some time, and became a close friend of Senator Carl Schurz. Dönhoff discusses in her memoirs her father's involvement in one of the last episodes of the Indian wars, the White River War.

Her mother was born Maria von Lepel (1869–1940). Marion studied economics at Frankfurt, where National Socialist sympathizers were said to have called her the "red countess" for her defiance once they gained power in 1933. She left Germany soon after, moving to Basel, Switzerland, where she earned her doctorate. But she later returned to her family home at Quittainen in 1938, and joined the resistance movement, which led to questioning by the Gestapo after a failed assassination attempt on Hitler in 1944. Although many of her fellow resistance activists were executed, she was released reportedly because her name was not found in any of the documents seized by the Nazis.

In January 1945, as Soviet troops rolled into the region, Dönhoff fled East Prussia, travelling seven weeks on horseback before reaching Hamburg. She recounted her journey in a 1962 book of essays called Names No One Mentions Anymore. The castle in which she grew up and which was destroyed by the Red Army in January 1945, is within the borders of what is now part of Russia (Kaliningrad oblast), yet she was one of the first public figures to endorse the finality of the border between Germany and Poland, which had been established after the Second World War.

In 1946, Dönhoff joined the fledgling, Hamburg-based intellectual weekly Die Zeit as political editor. In August 1954, she temporarily left the newspaper in protest against articles by Richard Tüngel, who had published, inter alia, a text of Nazi constitutional lawyer Carl Schmitt and went to London to work for The Observer. Soon afterwards, however, she returned to Hamburg, and was promoted to deputy editor-in-chief in 1955, then editor-in-chief in 1968, and publisher in 1972. She was elected a Foreign Honorary Member of the American Academy of Arts and Sciences in 1990.

She was involved in helping refugees settle in West Germany from East Germany and other parts of Europe.

At the time of her death on 11 March 2002, aged 92, Dönhoff was still co-publisher of the influential newspaper. She was the author of more than twenty books, including political and historical analyses of Germany as well as commentary on U.S. foreign policy. Among many international distinctions, Dönhoff was awarded honorary doctorates by Columbia University and Georgetown University.

Published works

English
 Foe into Friend: The Makers of the New Germany from Konrad Adenauer to Helmut Schmidt, translated by Gabriele Annan, Palgrave Macmillan, 1982; 
 "A UN Volunteer Force: The Prospects", New York Review of Books, 15 July 1993 (contributor)

German
 Namen die keiner mehr nennt, Eugen Diederichs Verlag, Köln 1962
 Amerikanische Wechselbäder : Beobachtungen und Kommentare aus vier Jahrzehnten, Stuttgart, 1983
 Weit ist der Weg nach Osten: Berichte und Betrachtungen aus fünf Jahrzehnten Kindheit in Ostpreußen, 1988
 Preußen—Maß und Maßlosigkeit, 1990
 Die Biene, Bibliogr. Inst. + Brockhaus, 1993; 
 Meyers Kleine Kinderbibliothek: Groß und Klein, Bibliographisches Institut & F.A. Brockhaus AG, 1993;  'Um der Ehre willen', Erinnerungen an die Freunde vom 20 Juli., Berlin 1994,

Awards and honors
 1971 Peace Prize of the German Book Trade
 1982 Honorary Senator of the University of Hamburg
 1990 Member of the American Academy of Arts and Sciences
 1994 Four Freedom Award for the Freedom of Speech
 1999 Honorary citizen of the city of Hamburg

References

Bibliography
 Dönhoff, Marion Gräfin. '''Um der Ehre willen', Erinnerungen an die Freunde vom 20 Juli. Berlin (1994), Bundesrepublik, 
 Heck, Kilian & Christian Thielemann (Hrsg.): Friedrichstein. Das Schloß der Grafen von Dönhoff in Ostpreußen. Deutscher Kunstverlag, München/Berlin 2006; 
 Von Schlabrendorff, Fabian. Offiziere gegen Hitler, a.a. O., 1945/1990 Bundesrepublik,

External links

1909 births
2002 deaths
People from Kaliningrad Oblast
German women journalists
German journalists
20th-century German journalists
20th-century German newspaper publishers (people)
German newspaper publishers (people)
German countesses
German resistance members
Fellows of the American Academy of Arts and Sciences
Place of death missing
Die Zeit founders
Recipients of the Four Freedoms Award
Die Zeit editors
Marion Dönhoff